Horsfieldia crassifolia is a species of plant in the family Myristicaceae. It is a tree that grows naturally in Sumatra, Peninsular Malaysia, Singapore and Borneo.

References

crassifolia
Trees of Sumatra
Trees of Malaya
Trees of Borneo
Near threatened flora of Asia
Taxonomy articles created by Polbot